Ekke Ozlberger (1 July 1891 – 30 June 1963) was an Austrian painter. His work was part of the art competitions at the 1936 Summer Olympics and the 1948 Summer Olympics.

References

1891 births
1963 deaths
20th-century Austrian painters
Austrian male painters
Olympic competitors in art competitions
Artists from Trieste
20th-century Austrian male artists